Atsabites is an ammonoid cephalopod belonging to the family Paragastrioceratidae that lived during the Middle Permian between about 295 and 290 million years ago.

The shell of Atsabites is evolute, discoidal; whorls slightly impressed dorsally, with numerous prominent lateral ribs and fine longitudinal lirae.

References

A.K.Miller, W.M.Furnish,& O.H.Schindewolf, 1957, Paleozoic Forms. Treatise on Invertebrate Paleontology Part L, Ammonoidea. Geological Society of America and University of Kansas Press.
Genus Atsabites in GONIAT 6/04/12

Extinct animals of Indonesia
Goniatitida genera
Permian ammonites
Atsabitidae